As of today, the World Customs Organization has a total of 184 members. The European Communities (now: European Union) joined "on an interim basis akin to those enjoyed by WCO Members".

Members list with date of membership
The 184 WCO members include 178 United Nations member states, one United Nations General Assembly non-member observer state (the State of Palestine), as well as Kosovo and 4 customs territories which are dependent territories. Those 184 members and the European Union are divided into the following regional groups:

East and Southern Africa

United Nations member states
— 1990-09-26
— 1978-08-25
— 1964-10-20
— 1993-07-01
— 2008-03-19
— 1995-08-08
— 1981-05-15
— 1973-08-06
— 1965-05-24
— 1978-08-02
— 1964-02-18
— 1966-06-06
— 1973-03-29
— 1987-07-01
— 1992-07-01
— 1964-03-03
— 2000-07-25
— 2012-10-04
— 2012-07-18
— 1964-03-24
— 1964-11-07
— 1964-11-03
— 1978-09-27
— 1981-03-19

Europe

United Nations member states (founders in bold)
— 1992-08-31
— 1998-09-03
— 1992-06-30
— 1953-01-21
— 1992-06-17
— 1993-12-16
— 1952-12-11
— 2008-07-04
— 1973-08-01
— 1993-07-01
— 1967-08-31
— 1993-01-01
— 1951-10-19
— 1992-06-18
— 1961-01-27
— 1952-10-06
— 1993-10-26
— 1952-11-04
— 1951-12-10
— 1968-09-16
— 1971-02-15
— 1952-09-23
— 1958-05-23
— 1952-11-20
— 1992-06-30
— 2000-02-10
— 1992-06-22
— 1992-06-18
— 1953-01-23
— 1968-07-06
— 1994-10-28
— 2006-10-24
— 1953-01-23
— 1994-07-01
— 1951-08-06
— 1974-07-17
— 1953-01-26
— 1969-01-15
— 1991-07-08
— 2001-03-27
— 1993-01-01
— 1992-09-07
— 1952-07-13
— 1952-10-17
— 1952-12-19
— 1997-07-01
— 1951-06-06
— 1993-05-17
— 1992-06-26
— 1952-09-12
— 1992-07-28
non-UN member, partially recognised state
— 2017-01-25
customs union

Far East, South and South East Asia, Australasia and the Pacific Islands

United Nations member states
— 2004-08-10
— 1961-01-05
— 1978-07-01
— 2002-02-12
— 1996-07-01
— 2001-04-03
— 1983-07-18
— 1997-07-01
— 1971-02-15
— 1957-04-30
— 1959-10-16
— 1964-01-15
— 1968-07-02
— 2007-01-16
— 1964-06-30
— 1995-09-08
— 1991-09-17
— 1991-03-25
— 1986-07-22
— 1963-05-16
— 1955-11-16
— 2002-03-18
— 1980-10-01
— 2001-10-01
— 1975-07-09
— 1967-05-29
— 1972-02-04
— 2003-09-19
— 2005-07-01
— 2009-11-17
— 1993-07-01
dependent, customs territories
— 1987-07-01
— 1993-07-07

North of Africa, Near and Middle East

United Nations member states
— 1966-12-19
— 2001-04-18
— 1956-10-26
— 1990-06-06
— 1964-01-01
— 1993-10-04
— 1960-05-20
— 1983-01-11
— 1968-07-01
— 2000-09-11
— 1992-05-04
— 1973-05-08
— 1960-06-08
— 1959-11-19
— 1966-07-20
— 1979-02-07
— 1993-07-01
United Nations General Assembly non-member observer state
— 2015-03-24

South America, North America, Central America and the Caribbean

United Nations member states
— 2017-04-10
— 1968-07-01
— 1974-08-16
— 1999-01-07
— 2008-04-22
— 1997-08-14
— 1981-01-19
— 1971-10-12
— 1966-07-01
— 1993-07-11
— 2001-08-29
— 1988-07-01
— 2004-07-28
— 1997-12-16
— 2005-07-07
— 1985-02-22
— 1976-07-29
— 1958-01-31
— 2005-12-08
— 1963-03-29
— 1988-02-08
— 1998-09-24
— 1996-03-08
— 1969-10-03
— 1970-01-27
— 2005-05-12
— 2018-11-26
— 1973-10-15
— 1970-11-05
— 1977-09-16
— 1996-07-01
dependent, customs territories
— 1988-07-11

— 1990-07-01

West and Central Africa

United Nations member states
— 1998-11-09
— 1966-09-16
— 1965-04-09
— 1992-07-01
— 1986-07-28
— 2005-02-16
— 1972-07-26
— 1975-09-02
— 1963-09-02
— 2021-12-22
— 1965-02-18
— 1987-10-14
— 1968-08-01
— 1991-10-30
— 2010-08-19
— 1975-01-07
— 1987-08-07
— 1979-10-02
— 1981-07-01
— 1963-08-21
— 2009-09-23
— 1976-03-10
— 1975-11-06
— 1990-02-12

Non-Members
The following states and territories are not members of the WCO: 

United Nations member states

States not members of the United Nations

The following states with limited recognition are not members of the WCO:

Notes

External links
 WCO membership List

World Customs Organization
Member States
World Customs Organization